The Woman Who Dared is a 1933 American drama black and white film directed by Millard Webb, produced by William Berke and scored by Lee Zahler.

Cast
 Claudia Dell as Mickey Martin - Factory Owner
 Monroe Owsley as Jack Goodwin, Newspaper Reporter
 Lola Lane as Kay Wilson - Office Secretary
 Douglas Fowley as Kay's Boyfriend
 Robert Elliott as Attorney
 Matty Fain as Sciato - a Racketeer
 Bryant Washburn
 Eddie Kane as King
 Esther Muir as Mae Compton
 Matthew Betz as Racketeer
 Paul Fix as Racketeer
 Sidney Bracey as Tom
 Joseph W. Girard as Police captain
 Herbert Evans

References

External links
 
 

American drama films
American black-and-white films
1933 drama films
Films directed by Millard Webb
Films produced by William Berke
Films scored by Lee Zahler
1933 films
1930s English-language films
1930s American films